Yomi (黄泉) is the Japanese word for the underworld.

Yomi may also refer to:

 Yomi (読み), meaning reading, such as the on'yomi and kun'yomi of kanji
 Yomi, an effeminate character in the manga Riki-Oh
 Koyomi Mizuhara, a fictional character in the anime and manga series Azumanga Daioh nicknamed "Yomi"
 Yomi (ヨミ), a fictional character in the anime and manga series Babel II
 Yomi Isayama (黄泉), a fictional character in the manga series Ga-rei and the prequel anime series Ga-Rei: Zero
 Yomi (YuYu Hakusho) (黄泉), a fictional character in the anime and manga series YuYu Hakusho.
 Yomi (card game) a card game by David Sirlin